The Sweetest Punch is a 1999 album by Bill Frisell, released as a companion to Elvis Costello and Burt Bacharach's 1998 album Painted from Memory. Many of the earlier album's songs are featured with new arrangements by Frisell, mostly in instrumental versions.

Vocals for three of the tracks are also featured, with Costello on "Toledo", Cassandra Wilson on "Painted from Memory", and Costello and Wilson in a duet on "I Still Have That Other Girl".

Track listing
All songs written by  Elvis Costello and  Burt Bacharach, except "Vamp Dolce", written by Frisell.
 "The Sweetest Punch" – 4:44
 "Toledo" – 5:25
 "Such Unlikely Lovers" – 5:43
 "This House Is Empty Now" – 5:03
 "Painted from Memory" – 4:10
 "What's Her Name Today?" – 4:58
 "In the Darkest Place" – 5:55
 "Vamp Dolce" – 3:25
 "My Thief" – 4:31
 "I Still Have That Other Girl" – 2:22
 "Painted from Memory (Reprise)" – 3:36
 "Long Division" – 3:59
 "Tears at the Birthday Party" – 3:44
 "I Still Have That Other Girl (Reprise)" – 1:52
 "God Give Me Strength" – 4:42

Personnel
 Bill Frisell — electric guitar, acoustic guitar
 Brian Blade — drums, percussion
 Don Byron — clarinet, bass clarinet
 Billy Drewes — alto saxophone
 Curtis Fowlkes — trombone
 Viktor Krauss — bass
 Ron Miles — trumpet

Charts

References

Elvis Costello albums
Bill Frisell albums
1999 albums
Decca Records albums